Sepiola rossiaeformis is a species of bobtail squid native to the Indo-Pacific.  Its exact range is unknown.

Little is known about the size of this species. The type specimen is 6.0 mm in mantle length.

The type specimen was collected off Java and is deposited at the Zoologisches Museum of the Universitat Hamburg.

The validity of S. rossiaeformis has been questioned.

References

External links

Bobtail squid
Marine molluscs of Asia
Molluscs of the Indian Ocean
Molluscs of the Pacific Ocean
Taxa named by Georg Johann Pfeffer
Molluscs described in 1884